Yuliya Lyakhova (born 8 July 1977) is a retired Russian high jumper.

Her personal best jump is 1.99 metres, achieved in September 1997 at the IAAF Grand Prix Final in Fukuoka.

Achievements

External links

1977 births
Living people
Russian female high jumpers
Athletes (track and field) at the 1996 Summer Olympics
Olympic athletes of Russia
Goodwill Games medalists in athletics
Competitors at the 1998 Goodwill Games